The Fanikang Game Reserve is a protected area in South Sudan, Africa. It is within a Ramsar site. The  flooded grassland and woodland habitat features key species of Nile Lechwe.

References

Game reserves of South Sudan